Shelley Celia Kitchen  (born 2 December 1979, in Kaitaia, New Zealand) is a female professional squash player from New Zealand.

At the 2006 Commonwealth Games in Melbourne, Victoria, Australia, Kitchen beat World No. 1 Nicol David of Malaysia in the third-place match to capture the women's singles Bronze Medal. She also won a Silver Medal in the women's doubles, partnering Tamsyn Leevey. Earlier in the year, Kitchen and Leevey won the women's doubles title at the World Doubles Squash Championships. In 2004, Kitchen finished runner-up in the mixed doubles at the World Doubles Squash Championships, partnering Glen Wilson.

Kitchen had her first child in February 2010. After getting sick in an attempt to come back for the 2010 Commonwealth games, she announced her retirement in December 2010. In the 2011 New Year Honours, Kitchen was appointed a Member of the New Zealand Order of Merit for services to sport.

See also
 Official Women's Squash World Ranking
 WISPA Awards

References

External links 

 

1979 births
Living people
Commonwealth Games silver medallists for New Zealand
Commonwealth Games bronze medallists for New Zealand
Members of the New Zealand Order of Merit
New Zealand female squash players
Squash players at the 2006 Commonwealth Games
People from Kaitaia
Commonwealth Games medallists in squash
Medallists at the 2006 Commonwealth Games